Vinje is a former municipality in the old Sør-Trøndelag county, Norway. The  municipality existed from 1924 until its dissolution in 1964. The municipality encompassed the areas around the inner Vinjefjorden and the Søo river valley in what is now the southern part of the present-day municipality of Heim. The administrative centre was the village of Vinjeøra. The lake Vasslivatnet lies in the eastern part of Vinje.

History
Originally (since 1838), Vinje was a part of the municipality of Hemne (see formannskapsdistrikt). Historically, the parish annex of Vinje actually belonged to Romsdalen county while the main parish of Hemne belonged to Søndre Trondhjem county. But according to the 1837 formannskapsdistrikt law, a parish could no longer be divided between two counties, so the annex of Vinje had to be transferred to the county of Søndre Trondhjem.

On 1 July 1924, the large municipality of Hemne was divided into Vinje municipality (population: 716) in the south, Snillfjord municipality (population: 776) in the east, and the rest of the municipality (population: 2,030) remained as Hemne. During the 1960s, there were many municipal mergers across Norway due to the work of the Schei Committee. On 1 January 1964, the neighboring municipalities of Vinje (population: 576), Hemne (population: 2,325), and the western part of the municipality of Heim (population: 711) were merged to form a new, enlarged municipality of Hemne.

Name
The municipality of Vinje (originally the parish annex) was named after the old Vinje farm, since the first Vinje Church was built there. The name is the plural form of vin which means "meadow" or "pasture".

Government
All municipalities in Norway, including Vinje, are responsible for primary education (through 10th grade), outpatient health services, senior citizen services, unemployment and other social services, zoning, economic development, and municipal roads. The municipality is governed by a municipal council of elected representatives, which in turn elects a mayor.

Municipal council
The municipal council  of Vinje was made up of 13 representatives that were elected to four year terms. The party breakdown of the final municipal council was as follows:

See also
List of former municipalities of Norway

References

Heim, Norway
Former municipalities of Norway
1924 establishments in Norway
1964 disestablishments in Norway